Ansdell and Fairhaven railway station is on the Blackpool South to Preston railway line in Lancashire, England. In the past, it has also been known as Ansdell Station, Ansdell's Gate station, and Ansdell's Halt.

The Royal Lytham & St Annes Golf Club, host to the Open Championship, is adjacent to the station. During national and international competitions the station is used to convey spectators to the course.

History

Opened by the Blackpool and Lytham Railway, then absorbed by the Preston and Wyre Joint Railway, the station joined the London, Midland and Scottish Railway during the Grouping of 1923. The station then passed to the London Midland Region of British Railways on nationalisation in 1948.

When Sectorisation was introduced in the 1980s, the station was served by Regional Railways 
until the Privatisation of British Railways.

The station was set out as an island platform with tracks on both faces until the singling of the line in 1986. Trains now only use the southern face. A disabled access ramp now covers the northern part of the station.

Facilities

The station is unmanned with basic waiting shelters, but has a ticket vending machine (to allow intending passengers to buy before boarding or collect pre-bought tickets) and digital display screen to offer train running information.  CCTV has been installed and running information can also be obtained by timetable posters and a payphone.  Step-free access is via the aforementioned inclined ramp from Woodlands Road.

Services

There is a basic hourly service in each direction Monday to Saturday, to Blackpool South and to Preston and Colne (though weekday trains are not advertised as running beyond Preston).

Sunday services also operate hourly each way.

References

Notes

Sources
 
 
 Station on navigable O.S. map Centre of the three stations on the map.

External links

 Blackpool & Fylde Rail Users’ Association—Ansdell / Fairhaven, accessed 17 October 2007

Lytham St Annes
Railway stations in the Borough of Fylde
DfT Category F2 stations
Former Preston and Wyre Joint Railway stations
Railway stations in Great Britain opened in 1872
Northern franchise railway stations
1872 establishments in England